Christopher Ndarathi Murungaru (born August 19, 1954, Nyeri, Kenya) is a former Kenyan politician, a former Member of Parliament for Kieni Constituency in Nyeri District and a former Minister of Transport.

When the National Rainbow Coalition (NARC) Government took power from Kenya African National Union (KANU) in 2003, Dr Murungaru was named Minister for Internal Security. He was later transferred to the Ministry of Transport in a cabinet reshuffle following revelation of the Anglo Leasing Scandal, allegations he didn't expressly deny. When President Mwai Kibaki reconstituted the cabinet following a humiliating defeat in the November 21, 2005 constitutional Referendum, he was dropped from the cabinet. He was a close ally of Kenyan President Mwai Kibaki.

Anglo Leasing Scandal
Murungaru has been embroiled in a conflict with the British Government following cancellation of his visa to enter the United Kingdom due to allegations of corruption in the Anglo-Leasing scandal. He has taken the British Government to court challenging the cancellation of his visa. He has hired prominent Kenyan lawyer Paul Muite and a group of British lawyers, Mr Rabinder Singh, a Queen's Counsel of Matrix Chambers, London, Mr Richard Stein, a senior partner in Leigh, Day and Company and Ms Tessa Hetherington, a junior counsel of Matrix to represent him.

On November 23, 2005, President Mwai Kibaki of Kenya dissolved his cabinet following a humiliating defeat on a referendum on the proposed constitution of Kenya. The President and his key allies, including Murungaru were campaigning for a 'Yes' vote on the constitution, which they lost, forcing the president to reconstitute his cabinet.

Fallout
On January 22, 2006, John Githongo named Murungaru as one of three top politicians (along with Kiraitu Murungi, former Justice Minister and present Energy Minister, and Finance Minister David Mwiraria) as being involved in a financial scam involving up to $600M  On February 1, 2006, Finance Minister David Mwiraria announced that he was stepping down as a minister and a member of cabinet to pave way for investigation. The news was received with joy by many Kenyans, though some saw him as a scapegoat who had been sacrificed to protect a president whose support had been waning.

On January 16, 2006, President Kibaki allowed anti-corruption chief Aaron Ringera to request Murungaru to declare and account for his wealth. Murungaru has since moved to court to prevent the Kenya Anti-Corruption Commission from investigating, saying fulfilling the commission's request would amount to self-incrimination.

Vice President Moody Awori announced on February 2, 2006 that he would not step down despite being adversely mentioned in the Anglo Leasing Scandal. He has insisted that he is innocent, and that nothing short of due process will make him resign his post. He has criticized by many people for defending those involved in the scandal before Parliament.

Court battles
On February 17, 2006, the Kenya Anti-Corruption Commission (KACC) arraigned Murungaru in a Nairobi court charging him with failing to declare and account for his wealth. The Commission believed that Murungaru had become too rich too quickly and was keen to investigate the source of his wealth, especially in relation to the Anglo Leasing Scandal. He denied refusing to declare his wealth, and was released on a bond of KES 200,000.

On December 1, 2006, the Kenyan High Court determined that KACC's notice to Murungaru was not carried out according to the laid down law which subsequently led to the High Court quashing KACC's case against Murungaru. The court did not however stop KACC from investigating Murungaru or anyone else for corruption but insisted that any orders issued by the Commission be done so in a legal manner.

A society in Kenya under the banner of the Name and Shame Corruption Network (NASCON) held a demonstration in the streets of Nairobi to push for the resignation of more senior people in President Mwai Kibaki's administration. Key among them is civil service boss Francis Muthaura and Vice President Moody Awori.

In May 2022, the Court of Appeal in Kenya reduced the fine payable to Murungaru by Githong from Ksh. 27 million ($228,000) to Ksh. 10,000,000 ($84,000). Murungaru had successfully sued Githongo for leaking a dossier that implicated him (Murungaru) in the Anglo Leasing scandal.

In what was considered an upset, Murungaru was defeated by a comparatively obscure candidate in the Party of National Unity's primary elections for its parliamentary candidates in November 2007.

See also
Anglo-Leasing scandal
Mwai Kibaki
Moody Awori
David Mwiraria
Kiraitu Murungi
Francis Muthaura

External links
 https://web.archive.org/web/20070927182114/http://www.parliament.go.ke/MPs/members_murungaru_dr_c.php
 https://web.archive.org/web/20070317164531/http://www.timesnews.co.ke/02dec06/nwsstory/topstry.html

References

1954 births
Living people
People from Nyeri County
Government ministers of Kenya
Members of the National Assembly (Kenya)